West End High School, Jhargram is a co-educational K-12 boarding school located in Jhargram, West Midnapore district, West Bengal. It is affiliated with the Council for the Indian School Certificate Examinations.
The school is administered by a non governmental organization known as Women in Social Action, which is committed to the improvement of underprivileged people, and especially tribals in West Bengal, Bihar and Odisha.

References

Boarding schools in West Bengal
High schools and secondary schools in West Bengal
Educational institutions established in 2000
Private schools in West Bengal
2000 establishments in West Bengal